Vigdarvatnet is a lake in the municipality of Sveio in Vestland county, Norway. A small arm off the main lake juts to the south and runs along the municipal-county border between Sveio in Vestland county and the town of Haugesund in Rogaland county. It is fed by the nearby lake Stakkastadvatnet to the south, and it empties into the Ålfjorden, a small fjord arm off the main Hardangerfjorden. The village of Sveio lies on the northwestern shore of the lake.

See also
List of lakes in Norway

References

Sveio
Haugesund
Lakes of Vestland
Lakes of Rogaland